The Seiad Valley AVA is an American Viticultural Area in Siskiyou County, California, located adjacent to the Klamath River and close to the border with Oregon. The wine region was granted AVA status in 1994 despite having only one commercially bonded winery in operation, Seiad Valley Vineyards, which has since ceased operations. The valley floor is covered in the excavated rock left behind as tailings from gold mining. The exposed rocks absorb and retain heat from the sun, moderating the effects of a cool, mountain valley climate.

See also
 California wine

References

American Viticultural Areas
American Viticultural Areas of California
Geography of Siskiyou County, California
1994 establishments in California